Manachanallur Giridharan (born 15 April 1964) is a South Indian music director, lyricist, singer, and also an educationist. He is also the founder of EdServ Softsystems Limited. He has founded his own music production house called Gaananjali Recordings in 2011 and has been producing non-film albums.

Giridharan also founded EdServ in the year 2001 as an Education and Training company.

His music works are largely in Tamil language.

Early life 

Manachanallur S. Giridharan hails from the town Manachanallur in Tiruchirappalli district. After completing Engineering graduation from PSG College of Technology, Coimbatore, in 1984 he was part of films assisting in song compositions, orchestrating the background score between 1986 and 1992 including Jenma Natchathram, Witness (1995 film), Puthiya Aatchi and Adhisaya Manithan. He became an assistant musician to the ace director K. Bhagyaraj in his film Sundara Kandam and even sang the title song 'EDHU PALLIKOODA VAYASU' in that film. Later he co-founded Software Solutions Integrated Limited (SSI), a premier Education and Training company of India, in 1991/92 before incepting Radiant Software Limited, another IT Training company in 1997, thus taking a break from film music.

Manachanallur Giridharan relaunched his music interests in 2011 and has been releasing devotional albums since then.

He acquired the Firth Grade certification in Western music from Trinity College London in 1991 and has specialized working knowledge in both South Indian Classical music and Western music. He is very fluent in Carnatic music Raga and their Swara and many of his compositions are based on Indian Classical ragas, thanks to Cuddalore Late Subramaniam Iyer, noted Carnatic music composer and vocalist who taught him the nuances of Carnatic music in his younger years.

Giridharan is also a singer since his college days and was part of the 2012 TekMusic Golden Jubilee Celebrations of PSG College of Technology.

Music Works 

S. Giridharan has remixed yesteryear classic melody of the film Velaikaari for his album on Lord Sakthi. The song INNAMUM PARA MUGAM originally sung by Nadippisai Pulavar K R Ramasamy was recreated by Giridharan who also rendered the song himself. Giridharan also remixed the song VADAVARAIYAI MATHAKKI, the age old classical done by M. S. Subbulakshmi in his album on Lord Balaji and the song was rendered by P. Unni Krishnan.

Following are the albums produced and released by Manachanallur Giridharan. His works are predominantly with singers viz., S. P. Balasubrahmanyam, P. Unni Krishnan, Nithyasree Mahadevan, Harini, and Saindhavi:

OM NAVA SAKTHI JAYA JAYA SAKTHI on Lord Sakthi
AYYAN MALAI ENGAL MALAI on Lord Ayyappa
VINDHAIGAL PURINDHAI NEE EN VAZHVILE on Lord Balaji of Tirumala
UCHI PILLAIYARE CHARANAM on Lord Ganesha
SABARIMALAI VA CHARANAM SOLLI VA on Lord Ayyappa
ALILAYIL URANGUKINDRA MAYAKKANNANE on Lord Krishna
AMBIGAI BALA KARTHIGAI RASA on Lord Muruga
ANDATHILADANGA ANNAMALAIYE on Lord Arunachala of Thiruvannamalai
VARUVAI VARALAKSHMI on Goddess Mahalakshmi
SRI KAMAKOTI PEETAM ALUM MAHA PERIYAVA on Kanchi Paramacharya
SRI RAMADOOTHAN on Lord Hanuman
INTHA SOWKHYA on Carnatic Krithis by UNNIKRISHNAN live

His works are there in www.raaga.com and www.galatta.com under devotional section. The songs are also in Youtube under the channel called GAANANJALI RECORDINGS.

Giridharan owns currently a popular Voice Culture Training outfit called SINGKARO in Kodambakkam, chennai.

References

External links 
Amman Album launch
Album on Lord Balaji
Giridharan as singer in Raaga.com
Giridharan as CEO of EdServ
Ayyappa album by Giridharan
Album on Lord Ganesha by Giridharan in Raaga.com
EdServ CEO launching album on Lord Ayyappa
Giridharan as EdServ CEO with ET
EdServ progress with Giridharan

Tamil film score composers
Tamil playback singers
Tamil-language lyricists
20th-century Indian composers
1964 births
Living people
Indian male playback singers
Musicians from Tiruchirappalli
Male film score composers
20th-century Indian male singers
20th-century Indian singers